Bell Creek is a stream in Washington, Dodge and Burt counties, Nebraska, in the United States.

Bell Creek was named for a family of pioneers who settled near its banks. The village of Craig is situated on the creek.

See also
 List of rivers of Nebraska

References

Rivers of Burt County, Nebraska
Rivers of Dodge County, Nebraska
Rivers of Washington County, Nebraska
Rivers of Nebraska